Norwegian County Road 3 is a county road in Vest-Agder county, Norway. It goes around the district of Søm, to the district of Randesund in the borough Oddernes. The road goes from Rona to Torsvik - Saltbustad - Korsvik - Dvergsnes - Odderhei - Holte - Tømmerstø - Vrånes - Kirkevik and Lykkedrag. The road ends with Norwegian County Road 401 which continues to Kristiansand, in west and Lillesand in east.

References

003
Transport in Kristiansand